Famous Crime Scene is a VH1 show that follows a documentary format. This show exposes the evidence and the last moments of a celebrity and the subsequent chaos about their deaths; all this through the view of special investigators, and even exposes the point of view and details that only the ones present are able to give.

Episodes

See also
The Killing of Tupac Shakur by crime author Cathy Scott (appeared in "Tupac Shakur" episode, 2010)
The Murder of Biggie Smalls by crime author Cathy Scott (appeared in "The Notorious B.I.G." episode, 2010)

References

2010 American television series debuts
2010 American television series endings
English-language television shows
VH1 original programming